Seena Sharp, author of Competitive Intelligence Advantage, is a recognized leader in Competitive Intelligence.  She founded one of the first competitive intelligence company, Sharp Market Intelligence, in the US in 1979, in Los Angeles, a company that serves clients across the US, Canada, Europe, Asia, and Africa.

Seena had a successful corporate career in New York City, where she earned her master's degree in mathematics.  Her research, speaking and conference activities focus on various aspects of market and competitive intelligence, including market drivers, keys to success, alternative uses, unknown customers, emerging competitors, competitor profiles, external factors, and opportunities.

Ms, Sharp has been widely published, speaks to organizations and universities throughout the US and Europe, and was presented with SCIP's Fellows Award.  She is widely known for her unique techniques for identifying growth opportunities and market changes, examples of which are available in her monthly SharpInsights.

Articles and Publications
 2014, Sharp, S "Shake Up Your Thinking, Shape Up Your Business: 68 SharpInsights to Attract Customers and Boost Sales" , 
 2013, Sharp, S. "SharpInsights: Your Little Black Book of Market Revelations", 
 2009, Sharp, S. Competitive Intelligence Advantage: How to Minimize Risk, Avoid Surprises, and Grow Your Business in a Changing World, (Wiley and Sons) 
 2005, Frates, J., Sharp, S. Using Business Intelligence to Discover New Market Opportunities, (Journal of Competitive Intelligence and Management), 3(3), p. 16 
 2004, Sharp, S. Build Better Decisions: Strategies for Reducing Risk and Avoiding Surprises, (Handbook of Business Strategy, Emerald Publishing Group Limited)
 2000, Sharp, S. Truth or Consequences: 10 Myths that Cripple Competitive Intelligence, (Competitive Intelligence Magazine), 3(1)
 2000, Sharp, S. Tracking Change in Unusual Ways, (Marketing News, A Publication of the American Marketing Association), 34(11)
 1998, Sharp, S. Substitutes: Your Next Marketing Headache, (Competitive Intelligence Magazine), 1(1) 
 1994, Sharp, S. Tomorrow's Competitive Intelligence: A Whole New Board Game, (Director's Monthly), 18(5)
 1994, Sharp, S. Information for Sale, (Home Office Computing)
 1993, Sharp, S.  Soft Information as Important as Hard Facts in Making Business Decisions, (The Planning Forum Network), 6(8)

External links
 http://www.sharpmarket.com/
 http://www.competitiveintelligenceadvantage.com/
 http://www.seenasharp.com/

References

American business theorists
Writers from California
New York University alumni
Living people
Year of birth missing (living people)